Olive (Hangul: 올리브), sometimes stylized as O'live, is a television channel in South Korea owned by CJ ENM E&M Division, a division of CJ Group. It was originally a food and cooking channel, but now airs a variety of lifestyle programming.

The channel was later replaced by tvN Sports, sister channel to tvN's sporting programming.

References

External links
  (in Korean)
 

CJ E&M channels
Television channels in South Korea
Korean-language television stations
Television channels and stations established in 2000
2000 establishments in South Korea